Gweneth (or Gwenneth) Molony (born 17 June 1932) is an Australian figure skater. She is the 1949–1951 Australian national champion. She represented Australia at the 1952 Winter Olympics, where she placed 21st.  She and Nancy Burley were the first ladies singles skaters to represent Australia at the Olympics. Molony also competed in pair skating; she is the 1949 Australian national champion with partner Adrian Swan. In 2020 at the IOC (International Olympic Committee) headquarters in Lausanne, she was recognised as Australia's first female Winter Olympian. She was presented with her Olympian certificate, and became the earliest Olympian to sign the athletes wall at the new IOC headquarters.

Family
Molony came from a skating family. Her father, E.J. "Ted" Molony, competed in ice dancing, and her elder sister, Patricia Molony, was the first Australian lady to compete at the World Championships.

Personal life
Molony married former ice hockey player and sports administrator Geoff Henke. Their daughter, Joanne, was a member of the Olympic downhill skiing team which competed in Innsbruck in 1976.

Competitive highlights

Single skating

Pair skating
(with Swan)

References

Sources
 
 Sport: Skating - Figure - Australian Olympic Committee
 

Australian female single skaters
Australian female pair skaters
Olympic figure skaters of Australia
Figure skaters at the 1952 Winter Olympics
1932 births
Living people